The 1952 Ohio State Buckeyes football team represented the Ohio State University in the 1952 Big Ten Conference football season. The Buckeyes compiled a 6–3 record.

Schedule

Game summaries

Indiana

Coaching staff
 Woody Hayes, head coach, second year

1953 NFL draftees

References

Ohio State
Ohio State Buckeyes football seasons
Ohio State Buckeyes football